Grčić is a village in Serbia. It is situated in the Ljubovija municipality, in the Mačva District of Central Serbia. In 2002 the village had a population of 334, all of whom were ethnic Serbs.

Demographics

1948: 874
1953: 875
1961: 817
1971: 668
1981: 545
1991: 400
2002: 334

References

See also
List of places in Serbia

Populated places in Mačva District
Ljubovija